Gravel Switch is an unincorporated community within Marion County, Kentucky, United States.  It is located along Kentucky Route 243, just south of its intersection with U.S. Route 68, southwest of Perryville and northeast of Bradfordsville.

A post office was established in the community in 1870, and it was named for a valuable gravel deposit to which the local railroad directed a railway track. on the Louisville and Nashville Railroad Lebanon Branch

The community is home to Penn's Store, the oldest general store in Kentucky.

References

External links

Unincorporated communities in Marion County, Kentucky
Unincorporated communities in Kentucky